Made in Britain is a 1983 British television play written by David Leland and directed by Alan Clarke. It follows a 16-year-old racist skinhead and his constant confrontations with authority figures. It was broadcast on ITV on 10 July 1983 as the fourth in an untitled series of works by Leland (including Birth of a Nation), based on the British educational system, which subsequently acquired the overall title of Tales Out of School. It marked Tim Roth's television debut.

Plot
Trevor has been tried in court charged with throwing a brick through the window of a Pakistani man, Mr. Shahnawaz. Trevor's social worker, Harry Parker takes him to Hooper Street Residential Assessment Centre, where his punishment will be determined. The centre's deputy superintendent, Peter Clive, admits Trevor and he is allocated a room with Errol.

The next day, Trevor leaves the assessment centre to look for jobs. Trevor and Errol break into a car and drive to the job centre. Trevor barges past the queue, demanding a job from the attendant. When asked to wait, he storms out and hurls a brick through the window. After escaping, he then breaks into another car, and takes it and drives away.

Inside the assessment centre later, Trevor does not cooperate. He demands lunch, only to be informed that he is too late. Trevor viciously attacks the chef before being stopped by care worker Barry Giller. Trevor is then held down by the chef and Barry, and locked up in a room.

The superintendent arrives and tells Trevor that he is heading to prison. He explains that the assessment centre is Trevor's last chance to change the cycle of poverty, crime and prison. Uncharacteristically, Trevor is not aggressive and is lost for words. As soon as the superintendent leaves, Trevor is back to his usual self. He rants about his views on race, authority, and the British educational and correctional systems. Eventually Barry and Peter decide to send him to a secure unit. However, while Barry is out making arrangements to send Trevor away, Peter offers to take Trevor banger racing if he promises to behave. Trevor accepts.

They go to the races and Trevor is given a chance to drive. Trevor seems to enjoy the experience, but gets into an accident, after which his car will not restart. Trevor cannot complete the race. On the drive back to the assessment centre, Peter informs Trevor that he could join a racing team if he wishes and would need not steal cars any longer.

After everybody has retired to bed, Trevor wakes up Errol and shows him Peter's keys, which he had taken. Trevor and Errol make their way into the office and Trevor finds their respective files. Trevor finds a report which says Errol will likely never return home. He drops the files on the floor and tells Errol to urinate and defecate on it. Errol defecates on his files, and Trevor urinates on his.

Trevor and Errol leave the centre, and drive away in the centre's Ford Transit van. They reach Mr. Shahnawaz's neighbourhood and hurl stones through the windows and scream racial slurs. They get into the van and drive away. Trevor drives to a police station, and smashes the van into a car. Errol is rendered unconscious by the impact. Trevor exits the van and runs away, leaving Errol to be apprehended by the police.

The next day, Trevor arrives at Harry's home. Harry tells him to go back to the assessment centre before it is too late. Trevor informs Harry of his misadventures, and tells him that he is turning himself in. Harry eventually makes the necessary calls to the police.

Trevor presses the buzzer in the room of the prison cell. The police officer orders him to keep his hands off the buzzer. Trevor walks away, but returns and proceeds to press the buzzer with his head. This time, another officer, PC Anson enters, with a truncheon. Trevor continues to provoke the officer. Anson tells Trevor that he would be taken to court in a few days, and this time he will end up in a detention centre or a borstal, not an assessment centre. Anson brings the truncheon down, hitting Trevor on the kneecap. Anson smiles and says, 'You think you're hard, don't you?' Trevor looks defeated. The warder tells Trevor that he is all talk and has no choice but to respect authority and obey the rules, like everybody else.

The film ends with Trevor recovering from the pain and grinning, as the warders shut the door of the cell.

Cast
Tim Roth as Trevor
Bill Stewart as Peter Clive
Geoffrey Hutchings as the Superintendent
Terry Richards as Errol
Eric Richard as Harry Parker
Sean Chapman as Barry Giller
Christopher Fulford as P.C. Anson

Production
After successful collaborations on previous projects like Beloved Enemy and Psy-Warriors, writer David Leland and director Alan Clarke were keen to team up again. Producer Margaret Matheson, whom had worked with both Leland and Clarke before (most notably on the original version of Scum) was taking over as Head of Drama at the-then newly created Central Television. Matheson was keen to develop a project about education and a series of four one-off plays eventually broadcast under the umbrella title Tales Out of School was commissioned.

David Leland, when interviewed in 1998, recalled that Clarke was initially reluctant to commit to the directing duties of Made in Britain - "he was trying then to do Contact; his mind was elsewhere [...] it was only because we were friends, we could meet and talk about Made in Britain."

Made in Britain is notable as one of the first British television dramas (and Clarke's first production) to make use of the steadicam. Fellow director Stephen Frears, who at that point was in the process of editing his film Walter, noted that his cameraman on that project - Chris Menges - was a "huge influence" on Clarke using the steadicam. Recalling the filming process in a 1998 interview, he noted that "Made in Britain was written very powerfully, and it had these rather long sequences which posed certain technical problems [...] he [Clarke] found a piece of equipment that liberated him from that." Clarke became so enamored with the technical properties of the steadicam that it would be used repeatedly throughout the rest of his filmed work throughout the 1980s, most notably on the BBC dramas Christine (1986), Road (1987), Elephant and The Firm (both 1989). Former BBC director of plays Chris Morahan noted that "Steadicam was the trigger for his creativity."

Despite being a production relatively free of complications, problems arose with the filming of the original ending. As scripted, the final shot of the production was to feature Trevor, now confined to a borstal, digging trenches in the backyard with all the other inmates and encouraging them to 'dig for Britain'. As David Leland noted in a 2016 interview accompanying the re-release of the play for Tales Out of School DVD collection, "I'm a country boy...I assumed everyone knew what trenching was." Director Clarke misunderstood the directions in the script, resulting in a scene where the borstal inmates are digging seemingly randomly placed holes. Deemed unsatisfactory and with insufficient funds to re-film it, the televised film closes on a freeze-frame of Trevor's grinning face in police custody. Screenshots and script directions from the original ending are enclosed on the aforementioned DVD.

Music
The music in the opening scene is the song "UK82" by Scottish punk rock band The Exploited. The album Council Estate of Mind by Skinnyman extensively samples the dialogue of the film.

References

External links

Made in Britain at the British Film Institute

Transcript by David Leland

1982 films
1982 television films
1980s coming-of-age films
1980s crime drama films
1980s prison films
1980s teen drama films
British coming-of-age drama films
British prison drama films
British teen drama films
Coming-of-age drama films
Films about race and ethnicity
Films about racism
Films directed by Alan Clarke
Skinhead films
Social realism in film
1980s gang films
Films about fascists
Films about neo-Nazis
Films about anti-fascism
1982 drama films
1980s English-language films
1980s British films
British drama television films